Robert Miano (born September 25, 1942) is an American actor.

Early life
Robert Miano was born in New York City and raised in the Southeast Bronx neighborhood. He is of Italian descent.

At the age of fifteen Robert Miano was discovered by a talent agent who happened to pass by a street corner in the Bronx and heard Miano singing with a doo-wop group. This would lead to a recording of "Kingdom Of Love" by the Preludes on the Cub Label, a new subsidiary of MGM Records.

Years later, at an open casting call, Miano auditioned for the lead rock singer in the play "Satyricon" and landed the role. The musical was presented at the Stratford Shakespearean Festival in Ontario, Canada. Subsequently, Miano spent several years traveling around Europe as a troubadour where he performed musical acts by singing and playing his guitar on the streets and in restaurants.

Career
When Robert Miano returned to New York City, he took up method acting studies with Lee Strasberg and Warren Robertson. It was during this time in the mid 70's that Miano garnered attention from numerous directors including Michael Winner, Howard W. Koch, and Chuck Workman, among others.

Upon his relocation to Los Angeles, Miano honed in on his craft as a character actor for over thirty years, appearing in hundreds of feature films and numerous television programs. He is perhaps best known for repeatedly playing mobster characters.

In 1994 and 1995, Miano played Bronx mob boss Joe Scully on the soap opera General Hospital. There his character was the one-time mentor and possible future rival to resident mobster Sonny Corinthos. Miano also portrayed real-life Bonanno crime family capo Alphonse "Sonny Red" Indelicato in the 1997 film Donnie Brasco, alongside Al Pacino, Michael Madsen, and Johnny Depp. He also co-starred in the film The Funeral, with Christopher Walken, Chris Penn, and Benicio del Toro. Miano played a mobster character called Frank "Frankie Eyes" Chalmers on the sci-fi series Star Trek: Deep Space Nine and real-life Mafia boss Vito Genovese in the 1999 television film Lansky, written by David Mamet.

Currently Robert Miano is represented by Beth Stein Agency and by Liz Fuller at Citizen Skull Productions.

Filmography

References

External links
 

1942 births
Living people
American male film actors
American male soap opera actors
American male television actors
Male actors from New York City
American people of Italian descent